Falling Off the Edge of the World was the North American version of The Easybeats album Vigil.  It was issued in October 1968 with a different album cover and running order from the UK release. This version was pared down to 12 songs from 14, omitting "Sha La La" and "We All Live Happily Together". A different recording of the title track (known as the "second version") replaced the more common version from the Australian and UK/European releases. This version of the album has also been released on CD, paired with Friday On My Mind on the Collectables label.

Track listing
All songs written by Harry Vanda & George Young except as noted.

Personnel

The Easybeats
Stevie Wright – vocals
Harry Vanda – vocals, lead guitar
George Young – vocals, rhythm guitar
Dick Diamonde – bass guitar
Tony Cahill – drums

Additional musicians
Steve Marriott – vocals on "Good Times"
George Alexander – vocals on "Come In You'll Get Pneumonia"

Production
The Easybeats – producer
Mike Vaughan – producer
Glyn Johns – producer

References

External links
[ allmusic - Falling off the Edge of the World]

The Easybeats albums
1968 albums